The Gabon bushbaby (Sciurocheirus gabonensis) is a species of primate in the family Galagidae found in Cameroon, Gabon, and the Republic of the Congo. Its head and body length is 8.5 in with a 10-in tail, and it weighs about 10 oz. It lives in evergreen tropical rainforests and eats primarily fallen fruit, but also some arthropods.

Distribution and habitat
The Gabon bushbaby is native to tropical western Central Africa. Its range extends from the Sanaga River in Cameroon, through the Congo Republic and Río Muni, in Equatorial Guinea to Gabon, where it is found between the Sanaga River and the Ogooué River. It is unclear whether it occurs to the south of the Ogooue River. Its typical habitat is dense humid forest where it lives in the lower part of the canopy among the lianas and tree trunks. It seems able to adapt to some extent to inhabiting secondary growth and partially felled areas.

Ecology
This bushbaby forages for small invertebrates and fruit which it finds on the forest floor. At birth the ratio between the sexes is 1:1 but among adults, the ratio of males to females is 1:4. This difference may be because the males travel greater distances and are therefore at greater risk of predation. Animals known to prey on this species include large snakes, the African palm civet (Nandinia binotata), the African linsang (Poiana richardsonii), and large owls.

Status
The Gabon bushbaby has a relatively wide range and is a fairly common species. Apart from some felling of forest for timber and for conversion into agricultural land, no particular threats have been identified. This bushbaby is present in a number of protected areas, so the International Union for Conservation of Nature has rated its conservation status as being of "least concern".

References

Gabon bushbaby
Fauna of Central Africa
Mammals of Gabon
Mammals of Cameroon
Mammals of the Central African Republic
Mammals of the Republic of the Congo
Mammals of the Democratic Republic of the Congo
Mammals of Equatorial Guinea
Gabon bushbaby
Gabon bushbaby